Kim Is a Genius is a Korean comedy, designed for an interactive phone-based experience, starring Yoo Young-jae, Park Soo-ah, Jung Sung-ho and Choi Moon-hee. The project was announced mid-2018 and premiered May 17, 2019 via an iOS and Android App.

Synopsis
Kim Is a Genius follows the peculiar happenings at Fisher-King, a viral marketing company whose (largely incompetent) employees come to depend on a number of mysterious smart-phone apps providing unusual and improbable services — from allowing users to see through photoshopped images to analyzing the content of the food they eat. Each episode is viewed as though through the phone of one character, from the hapless but handsome Chadol Chun to the ultra-competent but borderline-sociopathic Yeonseop Kim.

Cast

Main
 Yoo Young-jae as Chadol Chun
The youngest member of Fisher-King's Black Ops marketing team. His remarkable beauty commends an online cult following, despite his being functionally illiterate.
 Park Soo-ah as Gwanji Song
Once known for providing candids of K-Pop idols to their fans, she now specialises in trolling viral ad campaigns.
 Jung Sung-ho as Seonggu Do
The Black Ops team's boss, whose middle-aged attempts to pass for cool inspire the daily derision of those around him.
 Choi Moon-hee as Kim Yeon-seop
In her own head, at least, the only person at Fisher-King capable of getting anything done.

References

JTBC television dramas
Korean-language television shows
2019 South Korean television series debuts
2019 South Korean television series endings
South Korean romantic comedy television series
South Korean fantasy television series